Valentin Ivanovich Zubkov (12 May 1923 – 18 January 1979) was a Soviet film actor. He was born in Peschanoye Settlement of Ryazan Province. He finished Armavir Military Aviation School (1941–1943) and served as a pilot at frontlines of the German-Soviet War.

In the late 1940s Valentin Zubkov studied in Konstantin Voynov’s studio and later played the leads in his films Three Came Out of the Woods  and The Sun Shines for All  (1959), as well as episodic roles in Time of Summer Vacations (Vremya letnikh otpuskov) (1960) and Dream of an Uncle   (1966). He gave his film debut in Lev Kulidzhanov and Yakov Segel’s It Began This Way  (1956). In 1960 he joined the Theater Studio of Film Actor.

In 1957 Valentin Zubkov played a front soldier in The Cranes Are Flying   (1957) and a cowardly villain in The Communist  (1958). His most famous roles include those in the films Our Father's House  (1959), Leon Garros Is Looking for His Friend  (1961), Northern Story   (1960), Ivan's Childhood (1962), and A Day of Happiness  (1963). In the Hospital Train   Zubkov played together with his son Sergey.

Selected filmography
 The Cranes are Flying (Летят журавли, 1957)
 A Home for Tanya (Отчий дом, 1959)
 Over Tissa (Над Тиссой,1958)
 20,000 Leagues Across the Land (Vingt mille lieues sur la terre, 1960) 
 Yevdokiya (Евдокия, 1961)
 Man Follows the Sun (Человек идёт за солнцем, 1961)
 Ivan's Childhood (Иваново детство, 1962)
 Seven Nannies (Семь нянек, 1962)
 At War as at War (На войне как на войне, 1969)

References

External links
 
 Biography of Valentin Zubkov 

1923 births
1979 deaths
People from Ryazan Oblast
People from Sapozhkovsky Uyezd
Soviet male film actors
20th-century Russian male actors
Soviet military personnel of World War II
Honored Artists of the RSFSR